Ruins of Sissacherfluh Castle is a castle in the municipality of Sissach of the canton of Basel-Land in Switzerland.  It is a Swiss heritage site of national significance.

See also
 List of castles in Switzerland

References

External links
 

Cultural property of national significance in Basel-Landschaft
Ruined castles in Switzerland
Castles in Basel-Landschaft